The Taichung Park is an urban park in North District, Taichung, Taiwan. It is the oldest park in Taichung. It was built when Taiwan was under Japanese rule and is also called “Chungshan Park”.

History
The park, originally called , was built in 1903 during the Japanese era. On 17 April 1999, Taichung City Government listed it as city historical sites. In recent years, people have celebrated Lantern Festival in Taichung Park.

Features
The park has an artificial lake which covers an area of 13,530 m2. It also has two adjacent pavilions in the lake which were built to commemorate the establishment of Crossway Railway in 1908.

Facilities
The park has facilities for kayaking in the lake, tennis court, outdoor platform and kids playground.

See also
 List of parks in Taiwan

References

1903 establishments in Taiwan
Parks established in 1903
Parks in Taichung